The Basketball Bundesliga (BBL) Champions Cup is an inactive men's professional basketball game in Germany, which is comparable to other super cup games. The Basketball Bundesliga champion plays the game against the BBL-Pokal winner. Usually, the game is played in the arena of the German League champion, but there are no fixed rules.  When the same team wins both the Bundesliga and Pokal, then the Pokal runner-up will participate in the game.

Matches

Performances by club
Teams shown in italics are no longer in existence.

See also
 Basketball Bundesliga Awards
 Basketball Bundesliga Cup
 BBL All-Star Game
 German champions (basketball)

References

External links
German League official website 

 
Champions
2006 establishments in Germany
Basketball supercup competitions in Europe
Champions